Silvia Jato Núñez (born 6 June 1971 in Lugo, Spain) is a Spanish TV presenter and model.

She studied Economics at CEU San Pablo University, Madrid. She had three children with pilot Eduardo San Román, to whom she separated from in 2012, after being married to him since 1998.

She began as a model, and took part in Miss Spain in 1989 (being Maid of Honour) and in Miss Europe in 1991 (being Maid of Honour, Miss Photogenic and Miss Sympathy).

As a TV presenter she was nominated for prizes including TP de Oro (2001, 2002, 2003) and Premios ATV (2003, 2004).

Television programs 
1990:"Sabor a ti" TVG (Galician Autonomous Television)
1991:"Sabor 92", TVG
1991:"Gala pro-Bosnia", TVG
1991:"Gala Santiago de Compostela, Capital Cultural Europea del año 2000", TVG
1995:"Gala moda Pazo de Mariñán", TVG
1995-1996: "Pasarela de Estrellas", TVG
1996:"Gala de Nochevieja", Antena 3 Televisión
1996:"Gala moda Pazo de Mariñán", TVG
1997:En Antena, Antena 3: with Inés Ballester.
1997:Noche de Impacto, Antena 3: with Carlos García Hirschfeld.
1999-2000: Mírame, Antena 3
2000-2005: Pasapalabra, Antena 3
2004:Pelopicopata, Antena 3
2004:Los Más, Antena 3, with Arturo Valls.
2005:Gala de Nochevieja, Antena 3
2006:"¡Allá tú!", Telecinco, replacing Jesús Vázquez.
2007: Por la mañana, TVE, replacing Inés Ballester.
2007: contestant of El club de Flo, La Sexta.
2008: Fifty Fifty, Cuatro

References

External links

1971 births
Living people
People from Lugo
Spanish television presenters
Spanish female models
Spanish women television presenters